Samaguri Beel (also known as Pokhi Tirtha or Bird Pilgrimage) is a ox-bow shaped (U-shaped) wetland and lake located near to Nagaon of Nagaon district in Assam. This Beel is situated in the Brahmaputra river basin. This lake is formed by the abandoned path of the Kolong River.

Etmyology
Samaguri Beel is popularly known as Pokhi Tirtha. Pokhi Tirtha is the Assamese term for Bird Pilgrimage.  Varieties of species of migratory bird visit this lake during winter.

Avifauna
Varieties of species of migratory bird visit Samaguri lake during winter, such as Lesser whistling duck, Fulvous whistling duck, Ferruginous pochard, Whiskered tern, Cotton pygmy goose, Cinnamon bittern, Grey-headed lapwing etc.  This lake is a natural habitat to many varieties of birds, too; such as Bronze-winged jacana, Indian Pond Heron, Oriental Darter, Cattle Egret, White-throated kingfisher, Common Kingfisher, Grey-headed swamphen, Common Moorhen, White-breasted waterhen, Little Egret, Osprey, Little Cormorant, Asian openbill etc.

See also
List of lakes of Assam

References

Lakes of Assam
Nagaon district
Important Bird Areas of India